, provisional designation: , is a Jupiter trojan from the Greek camp, approximately  in diameter. It was discovered on 15 December 1998, by astronomers with the Lincoln Near-Earth Asteroid Research at the Lincoln Lab's ETS near Socorro, New Mexico. The dark Jovian asteroid has a rotation period of 12.7 hours and belongs to the 80 largest Jupiter trojans. It has not been named since its numbering in February 2001.

Orbit and classification 

 is a dark Jovian asteroid orbiting in the leading Greek camp at Jupiter's  Lagrangian point, 60° ahead of the Gas Giant's orbit in a 1:1 resonance . It is also a non-family asteroid in the Jovian background population.

It orbits the Sun at a distance of 5.0–5.4 AU once every 11 years and 11 months (4,356 days; semi-major axis of 5.22 AU). Its orbit has an eccentricity of 0.04 and an inclination of 19° with respect to the ecliptic. The body's observation arc begins with a precovery published by the Digitized Sky Survey and taken at the Siding Spring Observatory in March 1991, more than 7 years prior to its official discovery observation at Socorro.

Numbering and naming 

This minor planet was numbered on 8 February 2001. , it has not been named.

Physical characteristics 

 is an assumed C-type asteroid. Its V–I color index of 0.97 is typical for that of D-type asteroids, the dominant spectral type among the Jupiter trojans.

Rotation period 

Lightcurve analysis gave a rotation period of  hours and a brightness variation of 0.30 magnitude. Observations by his college Brian Warner at CS3 in July 2017, gave a similar period of 12.530 hours with an amplitude of 0.25 magnitude.

Diameter and albedo 

According to the surveys carried out by the Japanese Akari satellite and the NEOWISE mission of NASA's Wide-field Infrared Survey Explorer,  measures 54.91 and 56.08 kilometers in diameter and its surface has an albedo of 0.064 and 0.100, respectively. The Collaborative Asteroid Lightcurve Link assumes a standard albedo for a carbonaceous asteroid of 0.057 and calculates a diameter of 55.67 kilometers based on an absolute magnitude of 10.0.

Notes

References

External links 
 Asteroid Lightcurve Database (LCDB), query form (info )
 Dictionary of Minor Planet Names, Google books
 Discovery Circumstances: Numbered Minor Planets (20001)-(25000) – Minor Planet Center
 Small Bodies Data Ferret at the Asteroid (21601) 1998 XO89
 
 

021601
021601
19981215